James Aspinall (22 June 1795 – 15 February 1861) was a Church of England clergyman and miscellaneous writer.

Life
Born at Liverpool, England, in 1795, Aspinall was the son of John Bridge and Ann Aspinall, of Cleongar Hall, Cheshire. He graduated from St Mary Hall, University of Oxford as B.A. in 1820, and M.A. in 1823.

In 1831, Aspinall was the joint incumbent of the Church of St Luke, Liverpool, where he preached a remarkable sermon, "The Crisis, or the Signs of the Times with regard to the Church of England". In 1839 he became rector of Althorpe, Lincolnshire, which he held until his death in 1861. On 26 January 1844, he delivered an address at the major free trade meeting held at Hull, at which John Bright and Richard Cobden both spoke.

Aspinall was domestic chaplain for over thirty years to Baron Clonbrock, and was a clerical Justice of the Peace for Lindsey.

Works
In 1853, after the William Roscoe Centenary at Liverpool, Aspinall published Roscoe's Library, or Old Books and Old Times, dedicated to the Earl of Carlisle.

Family
Aspinall married, firstly, 3 October 1816, Harriet Lake. She was the daughter of William Charles Lake (died 1836), from South Carolina, an estate owner in Jamaica and merchant in Liverpool, and his wife with surname Orange, of Norfolk, Virginia. They had five sons and three daughters:

John Bridge Aspinall
Athelstan Maurice Aspinall
Harriet
Clara
Dudley Lake Aspinall
Clarke Aspinall
Butler Cole Aspinall (1830–1875).
Emily Ann.

He married, secondly, 17 January 1861 at West Butterwick, Lincolnshire, Annie, widow of W. Hunter of the Ings, East Butterwick, dying the same year.

References

External links
 
 
 

People from Cheshire
1795 births
1861 deaths
19th-century English Anglican priests
19th-century English writers
Alumni of St Mary Hall, Oxford
English male writers
19th-century male writers